is a Japanese actress and voice actress from Yokohama, Kanagawa Prefecture, Japan.

Filmography

Anime
1976
 Yōkai-den Nekomekozō as Mineko
1977
 Muteki Chōjin Zambot 3 as Sumie Koe, Kimiko Kamikita & Michi
1978
 Muteki Kōjin Daitarn 3 as Commander Sumika
1979
 Doraemon as Suneo's Mom
 Mobile Suit Gundam as Colin childcare officer
 Koguma no Misha as Magomago
 Toshi Gordian as Elias, Toropinu
1980
 Space Warrior Baldios as Doctor Era Quinstein
1981
 Wanwan Sanjushi as Francois's mother
1982
 The Super Dimension Fortress Macross as Linn Feichun, Moruk Laplamiz, Yoshio (ep 1)
1983
 Akū Daisakusen Srungle as Semiira
 Miyuki as Insurance doctor
1985
 Saber Rider and the Star Sheriffs as Moro
 Shōwa Ahōzoshi Akanuke Ichiban! as Happo Rika
1990
 My Daddy Long Legs as Sloane
 Obatarian as Sayuri
2000
 Fighting Spirit as Kimura's mother
2002
 RahXephon as Nanny
 Getbackers as Kazuki's Mother
2004
 The Melody of Oblivion as Old Lady's Voice
 Rozen Maiden as Matsu Shibasaki
 Fafner in the Azure as Hester Gallop
2005
 Rozen Maiden: Träumend as Matsu Shibasaki
2006
 Nishi no Yoki Majo - Astraea Testament (Tabitha Holy)
 Pénélope tête en l'air as Grandma
2007
 Moonlight Mile as Elizabeth Korsakov
 Romeo × Juliet as Ariel
2009
 Slap Up Party -Arad Senki- as Dark Elf General
 Kiddy Girl-and as Grandmother
2010
 Strike Witches 2 as Anna Ferrara
2015
 Fafner in the Azure: Exodus as Hester Gallop
2016
 Maho Girls PreCure! as Head Teacher
2018
Pocket Monsters: Sun & Moon as Naganadel
2019
Chihayafuru 3 as Taeko Miyauchi

Movies
Doraemon: Nobita and the Castle of the Undersea Devil as Suneo's Mama
Doraemon: Nobita and the Dragon Rider as Suneo's Mama
Doraemon: Nobita and the Steel Troops as Suneo's Mama
Doraemon: Nobita in Dorabian Nights as Suneo's Mama
Doraemon: Nobita's Dinosaur as Suneo's Mama
Gundam I: the Movie as Fam Bow
The Super Dimension Fortress Macross: Do You Remember Love? as Moruk Lap Lamiz

Tokusatsu
1985
Dengeki Sentai Changeman as Miraleca

Dubbing
Cube 2: Hypercube as Mrs. Paley (Barbara Gordon)
Ghost World as Roberta Allsworth (Illeana Douglas)
Mac and Me as Linda (Laura Waterbury)
Only Murders in the Building as Rose Cooper (Shirley MacLaine)
Untraceable as Stella Marsh (Mary Beth Hurt)
Zombi 2 (1982 TBS edition) as Paola Menard (Olga Karlatos)

References

External links
 

1947 births
Living people
Japanese video game actresses
Japanese voice actresses
Ken Production voice actors
Voice actresses from Yokohama
20th-century Japanese actresses
21st-century Japanese actresses